The province of Abra has 303 barangays comprising its 27 municipalities.

Barangays

References

 01
Abra